Blind Youth is a 1920 American silent drama film directed by Edward Sloman and starring Walter McGrail, Leatrice Joy, and Claire McDowell. It was based upon the play of the same name by Lou Tellegen and Willard Mack. It is not known whether the film currently survives.

Plot
As described in a film magazine, when Elizabeth (McDowell) and Pierre Monnier (Swickard) part, the mother takes one son, Henry (Kinny), while the father takes the other, Maurie (McGrail), to Paris. Maurie shows promise as a sculptor, but his life is ruined when he marries Clarice (Carew) and she deserts him to go with Jules Chandoce, a returning soldier. When his father dies, Maurie returns to New York, but finds his mother and brother ashamed of him. He walks the street for a time and contemplates suicide, but becomes inspired after meeting artist model Hope Martin (Joy). With her posing for him he makes a figure called "Blind Youth" which makes him famous overnight. After confessing his love to Hope, he tells her of his unfortunate marriage. Clarice reappears to share Maurie's recent fortune, but, after finally realizing that his happiness means more to her than money, she confesses to him that their marriage was illegal as Chandoce really was her husband. Maurie and Hope then wed.

Cast
Walter McGrail as Maurie Monnier
Leatrice Joy as Hope Martin
Ora Carew as Clarice Monnier
Claire McDowell as Elizabeth Monnier
Josef Swickard as Pierre Monnier
Charles A. Post as American Tubby
Leo White as French Louis
Helen Howard as Matilda Packard
Clara Horton as  Bobo
Colin Kinny as Henry Monnier

Production
Two hundred extras were used in a scene set in the world of a "bohemian" New York cabaret. Director Sloan completed the film after Alfred E. Green became ill.

References

External links

TCM synopsis

1920 films
1920s English-language films
American silent feature films
1920 drama films
Silent American drama films
American films based on plays
Films directed by Edward Sloman
Films set in Paris
Films set in New York City
American black-and-white films
Selznick Pictures films
1920s American films